Vapniarka, also known as Vapniarca, Vapnyarka, Wapnjarka or Wapniarka, is an urban-type settlement in Tulchyn Raion, Vinnytsia Oblast, Ukraine, known since 1870 as a railroad station. Its name from the Ukrainian language translates as a lime (gypsum) settlement. As of January 2022 Vapniarka's population was approximately 

During World War II, following the start of Operation Barbarossa, Vapniarka was administered by Romania. From October 22, 1941, to March 1944, it was included in the region of Transnistria and became the site for a concentration camp for members of the Romanian Jewish community. This succession of events formed a part of The Holocaust in Romania.

Today, Vapniarka serves as the final train destination for visitors traveling to villages in Tomashpilskyi and Yampilskyi Raion of Vinnytsia Oblast. From here, buses or private transportation are used to get to villages like Busha, Dzyhivka, Olhopil, Tomashpil, and Sobolivka.

World War II camp

In October 1941, the Romanians established a detention camp in Vapniarka. One thousand Jews were brought to the site that month, mostly from the city of Odessa. Some 200 died in a typhus epidemic; the others were taken out of the camp in two batches, guarded by soldiers of the Romanian Gendarmerie, and shot to death.

References

External links

Nizkor Project  Tesimony of a camp inmate
Shoah Resource Center - Yad Vashem Personal artifacts from camp inmates, including Vapniarka
Local site in Ukrainian about modern Vapniarka 

Urban-type settlements in Tulchyn Raion
Holocaust locations in Ukraine